Erupa prodigialis is a moth in the family Crambidae. It was described by Zeller in 1877. It is found in Brazil.

References

Erupini
Moths described in 1877